Nishanebaaz or Nishane Bazi is a 1989 Bollywood action film directed by V N Menon and starring Sumeet Saigal, Shakti Kapoor, Kader Khan and Anupam Kher. The movie was released on 13 April 1989.

Cast
 Sumeet Saigal
 Shakti Kapoor
 Anupam Kher
 Kader Khan
 Sripradha

Soundtrack
Tumhein Mera Salaam is most loved song by Muslims.

External links

References

1980s Hindi-language films
1989 films
Indian action films